Parkdale station may refer to:

 Parkdale railway station, Victoria, Australia
 Parkdale station (Toronto), Ontario, Canada; aka North Parkdale railway station

See also
 South Parkdale station, Parkdale, Toronto, Ontario, Canada; a passenger rail station
 Sunnyside station (Toronto), Parkdale, Toronto, Ontario, Canada; a passenger rail station; 
 Parkdale (disambiguation)